Port-Bouët is a suburb of Abidjan, Ivory Coast. It is one of the 10 urban communes of the city. Port-Bouët is one of four communes of Abidjan that are entirely south of Ébrié Lagoon, the others being Treichville, Koumassi, and Marcory.

Port-Bouët had not been inhabited until around 1930. The Port Bouët/Petit Bassam lighthouse (French: Phare de Port Bouët (Petit Bassam)) was built in the early 1930s. 

Félix-Houphouët-Boigny International Airport (French: Aéroport international Félix Houphouët-Boigny or Aéroport international Abidjan) is located in Port-Bouët.

References

Communes of Abidjan
Suburbs in Ivory Coast